This is about the American football player; for others, see Theodore Wright (disambiguation).

Weldon H. "Ted" Wright (November 15, 1913 – December 1, 1983) was an American football halfback who played professionally in the National Football League (NFL) for the Boston Redskins and the Brooklyn Dodgers.  He played college football at North Texas State Teachers College.

Early life
Wright was born in Savoy, Texas and attended Sherman High School in Sherman, Texas.

College career
Wright attended and played college football at North Texas State Teachers College, now known as the University of North Texas.  He became the first player from North Texas to play in the NFL.

Professional career
In November, he was purchased by the Brooklyn Dodgers, where he played for the remainder of the season.

References

External links
 

1913 births
1983 deaths
American football halfbacks
Boston Redskins players
Brooklyn Dodgers (NFL) players
North Texas Mean Green football players
Sherman High School (Texas) alumni
People from Fannin County, Texas
Players of American football from Texas